Chariesthes argentea is a species of beetle in the family Cerambycidae. It was described by Hintz in 1912. It is known from the Democratic Republic of the Congo and Uganda.

References

Chariesthes
Beetles described in 1912